The individual show jumping event at the 2020 Summer Olympics is scheduled to take place on 3–4 August 2021 at the Baji Koen. Like all other equestrian events, the jumping competition is mixed gender, with both male and female athletes competing in the same division. 75 riders from 35 nations are expected to compete.

Background

This will be the 26th appearance of the event, which had first been held at the 1900 Summer Olympics and has been held at every Summer Olympics at which equestrian sports have been featured (that is, excluding 1896, 1904, and 1908). It is the oldest event on the current programme, the only one that was held in 1900.

The Czech Republic, the Dominican Republic, Israel, and Latvia have all qualified riders or teams and are each scheduled to make their debut in the event. France and the United States have both qualified teams and are expected to compete for the 23rd time, tied for most of any nation.

The reigning World Champion is Simone Blum of Germany. The reigning Olympic champion, Nick Skelton did not return to defend his title, having retired shortly after the 2016 Games.

Qualification

A National Olympic Committee (NOC) could enter up to 3 qualified riders in the individual jumping if the NOC qualified for the team event or up to 1 qualified rider if the NOC did not qualify for the team event. A total of 75 quota places were available. 

The 20 NOCs that qualified teams and received automatic entries for 3 riders each in the individual competition were:

 The host, Japan
 6 from the World Equestrian Games: the United States, Sweden, Germany, Switzerland, the Netherlands, and Australia
 3 from the European Jumping Championships: Belgium, Great Britain, and France
 1 each from the Groups C1 and C2 qualification events: Israel (C1) and the Czech Republic (C2, replacing Ukraine, which failed to submit its NOC Certificate of Capability)
 3 from the Pan American Games: Brazil, Mexico, and Argentina
 2 each from the Groups F and G qualification events: Egypt and Morocco (F) and New Zealand and China (G)
 1 at-large place at the Jumping Nations Cup Final: Ireland

There were also 15 places available for individual spots. NOCs with qualified teams were not eligible. Each NOC could only earn one individual place. Most of the places were limited by geographic group. The places went to:

 4 from the Pan American Games for Groups D and E: (Colombia, the Dominican Republic, Canada, and Chile)
 2 each from the following regional groups by ranking:
 Group A: Denmark and Norway
 Group B: Italy and Portugal
 Group C: Latvia and Ukraine
 Group F: Syria and Jordan
 Group G: Chinese Taipei and Hong Kong
 1 place at-large for the highest-ranked individual from an NOC not yet qualified.

Because qualification was complete by the end of the calendar year 2019 (the ranking period ended on December 31, 2019), qualification was unaffected by the COVID-19 pandemic.

Competition format

For the first time since 1992, the show jumping competition format is seeing significant changes. The five-round format (three-round qualifying, two-round final) has been eliminated, with single rounds for each of the qualifying and final. The number of team members per NOC has been reduced from four to three (with even more significant impact on the team competition). Ties in the advancement spot will now be broken rather than all tied riders advancing. The top 30 riders will advance from the qualifying to the final.

The qualifying round will feature a course with a minimum distance of 500 metres and a maximum of 650 metres. The speed required is 400 metres per minute, though the Technical Delegate may reduce this to 375 metres per minute. There will be between 12 and 14 obstacles, including 1 or 2 double jumps and 1 triple jump, with a maximum of 17 possible jumps (that is, if there are 14 obstacles, only 1 double jump is permitted). The height of obstacles is between 1.40 metres and 1.65 metres, with spread of up to 2 metres (2.20 metres for the triple bar). In general, ties are not broken; however, for the last advancement place, any tie will be broken by time. Only if tied on both faults and time will more than 30 riders advance.

Scores do not carry over from the qualifying to the final. The final will feature a course with a minimum distance of 500 metres and a maximum of 700 metres, with the same speed provisions as the qualifying. The number of obstacles will be from 12 to 15, again with 1 or 2 double jumps and 1 triple jump, with a maximum of 19 possible jumps (15 obstacles with 2 doubles and a triple). The height and spread rules remain the same. Ties are generally broken by time (the round is "against the clock"), but a tie on faults for first place will be broken by a jump-off. A tie for second or third place will only be broken by a jump-off if the faults and time are the same.

The jump-off, if necessary, will feature a six-obstacle course.

Schedule

All times are Japan Standard Time (UTC+9)

Results

Qualification
The best 30 athletes (including all tied for 30th place) after the individual qualifier progress to the individual final.

Final

Jump-Off

References

Individual jumping